Taza, Son of Cochise is a 1954 American Western film directed by Douglas Sirk and starring Rock Hudson and Barbara Rush. The film was shot in 3D, and is one of just two films confirmed to have been released in the Pola-Lite 3D System using one projector.

Plot
Three years after the end of the Apache Wars, peacemaking chief Cochise dies. His elder son Taza (Rock Hudson) shares his ideas, but brother Naiche (Bart Roberts) yearns for war...and for Taza's betrothed, Oona (Barbara Rush). Naiche loses no time in starting trouble which, thanks to a bigoted cavalry officer, ends with the proud Chiricahua Apaches on a reservation, where they are soon joined by the captured renegade Geronimo, who is all it takes to start a war.

Cast

Production
It was the third time Jeff Chandler played Cochise, following Broken Arrow and The Battle at Apache Pass. Parts of the film were shot in Castle Valley, Professor Valley, Sand Flats, Devil's Garden, and Arches National Park in Utah.

Acknowledgment in end credits
"We gratefully acknowledge the assistance of the National Park Service of the United States Department of the Interior whose splendid cooperation made possible the photography of scenes at Arches National Monument Park".

Home media availability
 Universal Home Video, in conjunction with Turner Classic Movies, released a print-on-demand Region 1 DVD of Taza, Son of Cochise in 2014. 
 KL Studio Classics released a new 2K 3D restoration of the title on Region A Blu-ray in May 2020 in combined 3D and 2D formats.

References

External links
 
 
 Review of film at Variety
 Taza, Son of Cochise at the 3-D Film Archive

1954 films
1954 Western (genre) films
1954 3D films
American Western (genre) films
American 3D films
Films about Native Americans
Universal Pictures films
Films directed by Douglas Sirk
Films produced by Ross Hunter
Films shot in Utah
Films scored by Frank Skinner
1950s English-language films
1950s American films